The Louisiana slimy salamander (Plethodon kisatchie) is a species of salamander in the family Plethodontidae. It is endemic to the United States where it is only known from northern Louisiana and southern Arkansas. Its natural habitat is hardwood forests. Little is known about this species, but it appears to be common within its range with some populations likely impacted by deforestation.

References

Plethodon
Amphibians of the United States
Taxonomy articles created by Polbot
Amphibians described in 1989